Persian maqam is a notion in Persian classical music. Quoting Nooshin,

According to Hormoz Farhat,

Persian maqams have also been known in South Asia. The Sanskrit theorist Pundarika Vitthala noted the names of the Persian maqams in his sixteenth-century treatise Ragamanjari.

References

Persian classical music